Paglee (Assamese:পাগলী ; English:Mental) is an Assamese language romantic action film directed by Rupjyoti Borah. This film features Nayan Nirban Baruah and Prastuti Parashar in lead role. It was produced and distributed by Rimzim Films.

Cast

 Prastuti Parashar as Karbi
 Nayan Nirban Baruah as Raja
 Arun Hazarika
 Siddhartha Kalita
 Ramen Tamuli

Soundtrack

The movie has three songs sung by Zubeen Garg, Priyanka Bharali and Subasana Dutta.

References

External links
 

2010s Assamese-language films